Elections to Colchester Borough Council were held on 5 May 1987 alongside local elections across the United Kingdom.

Summary

Ward results

Berechurch

Castle

Copford & Eight Ash Green

Great & Little Horksley

Great Tey

Harbour

Lexden

Mile End

New Town

Prettygate

Pyefleet

Shrub End

St. Andrew's

St. Anne's

St. John's

St. Mary's

Stanway

Tiptree

West Mersea

Wivenhoe

References

1987
1987 English local elections
1980s in Essex